Aníbal José "Jossie" Torres is a Puerto Rican politician and lawyer affiliated with the Popular Democratic Party (PPD). Torres has served in several positions of leadership within his party. He served as Secretary of the party during the 2000s, before being appointed as Puerto Rico Chief of Staff by elected Governor Aníbal Acevedo Vilá in 2005. After serving four years, he returned to his position as Secretary of the PPD, before deciding to run for the Senate of Puerto Rico at the 2012 general elections.

Biography
Aníbal José Torres was born in Orocovis, Puerto Rico. He ran for mayor of Orocovis at the 2000 general elections. However, he lost to the candidate of the PNP, Jesús Colón Berlingeri, by less than 340 votes.

Has a Juris Doctor degree from the Eugenio María de Hostos School of Law in Mayaguez, Puerto Rico, and a B.A. in political science from the Interamerican University of Puerto Rico.

After that, Torres served as Secretary of the Popular Democratic Party for several years. When Aníbal Acevedo Vilá was elected Governor of Puerto Rico at the 2004 general elections, he appointed Torres to serve as his chief of staff. Torres served in this position until the end of Acevedo Vila's term in January 2009.

After that, Torres returned to his position as Secretary of the party. However, he decided to run for the Senate of Puerto Rico, presenting his candidacy on October 12, 2011. At the 2012 PPD primaries, Torres was the second candidate to the Senate with most votes.

Was officially elected as Chair of the Puerto Rico Popular Democratic Party on at the 2018 Puerto Rico Popular Democratic Party convention and served until 2020.

References

|-

Chiefs of Staff of Puerto Rico
Interamerican University of Puerto Rico alumni
Living people
Members of the Senate of Puerto Rico
People from Orocovis, Puerto Rico
Popular Democratic Party (Puerto Rico) politicians
Puerto Rican party leaders
Year of birth missing (living people)